Juarez Machado (born 1941 in Joinville, Santa Catarina, Brazil) is a Brazilian painter.

Biography
Machado studied fine arts at the School of Art in the state of Paraná, in the city of Curitiba. He has worked in illustration, theatre,  television, sculpture, and gravure. Since 1986, he has lived in Paris.

Anecdote
He influenced Jean-Pierre Jeunet's films from his own words.

External links 
Biography

Brazilian painters
Artists from Paris
People from Joinville
1941 births
Living people